Lex Machina, Inc. is a company that provides legal analytics to legal professionals. It began as an IP litigation research company and is now a division of LexisNexis. The company started as a project at Stanford University within the university's law school and computer science department before launching as a startup in Menlo Park, California. Lex Machina provides a SaaS product to legal professionals to aid in their practice, research, and business.

History
Lex Machina initially began in 2006 as a public interest project at Stanford University by Professor Mark Lemley and co-founders George Gregory and Joshua Walker. The project was developed within the university's law school and computer science department under the IP Litigation Clearinghouse (IPLC) project. Lex Machina was incorporated in 2008 and launched the following year. The name "Lex Machina" is a Latin phrase meaning "law machine" that Walker had used in a research paper he wrote in 2004. Walker was named the CEO of the company until venture capitalist Josh Becker took over in 2011. In 2015 the company was acquired by LexisNexis. Former CTO Karl Harris became CEO of Lex Machina in 2018.

Company developments
Lex Machina is based in Menlo Park, just north of Palo Alto and Stanford. While still a public interest project at Stanford, Lex Machina generated approximately $3 million in donations. In 2012, the company reportedly received $2 million in funding led by X/Seed Capital Management. Lex Machina generated another $4.8 million in a Series A round of funding in 2013 led by Cue Ball Capital. LexisNexis acquired Lex Machina in 2015.

Services
Lex Machina is a legal analytics solution that uses natural language processing, machine learning, and technology-assisted human review to deliver case resolutions, damages, remedies, findings, and accurate counsel and party data. Its engineering processes acquire and maintain a constantly updating database of case data and documents necessary to provide accurate data. Lex Machina gathers raw information from cases, including downloading millions of court documents, to present the comprehensive and accurate data. It cleans, tags, codes, enhances, and presents the resulting data in a way that makes it easy for legal professionals to access insights and grasp trends that are relevant to a specific legal matter.

Lex Machina currently provides legal analytics on any federal commercially relevant civil court case in 17 practice areas, as well as civil cases in 16 state courts. The services Lex Machina provides can be used within a variety of industries, and the company has clients ranging from law firms (including three-quarters of the AmLaw 100) to companies (including Facebook, Nike, Microsoft, and Uber). Lex Machina allows qualifying public-interest entities to access its services for free.

References

Law firms established in 2006
American companies established in 2006
2006 establishments in California
Law firms based in California